Darren Obah (born 16 December 1963) is an Australian boxer. He competed in the men's welterweight event at the 1988 Summer Olympics.

References

External links
 

1963 births
Living people
Australian male boxers
Olympic boxers of Australia
Boxers at the 1988 Summer Olympics
People from Nambour, Queensland
Welterweight boxers